Paul Summers, Attorney General of Tennessee, U.S.A.

Paul Summers may also refer to:

Paul Summers, fictional character in Far Cry (film)
Paul Summers, character in The Doctors (1963 TV series)

See also
Paul Somers, pseudonym of the crime novelist, Paul Winterton
Paul Sommer (disambiguation)